Ivan Bulaja (October 25, 1977, Split, Croatia) is a Croatian sailor and sailing trainer. He competed at the 2008 in the 49er class.

Together with Pavle Kostov and Petar Cupać he is a recipient of the Pierre de Coubertin medal. In the 2008 Summer Olympics they lent their boat to Danes Jonas Warrer and Martin Kirketerp whose mast had broken shortly before the start of their race. Warrer and Kirketerp went on to win a gold medal.

References

External links
Profile

Croatian male sailors (sport)
Sailors at the 2000 Summer Olympics – 470
Olympic sailors of Croatia
Living people
Recipients of the Pierre de Coubertin medal
1977 births